This List of impact craters in Antarctica includes only unconfirmed and theoretical impact sites in Antarctica and the surrounding waters of the Southern Ocean. There are not yet any confirmed impact sites in Antarctica according to the Earth Impact Database.

Unconfirmed impact craters 
The following craters are officially considered "unconfirmed" because they are not listed in the Earth Impact Database. Due to stringent requirements regarding evidence and peer-reviewed publication, newly discovered craters or those with difficulty collecting evidence generally are known for some time before becoming listed. However, entries on the unconfirmed list could still have an impact origin disproven.

See also 
 Impact craters
 Impact events
 Bolides and Meteorites
 Earth Impact Database – primary source
 Traces of Catastrophe book from Lunar and Planetary Institute - comprehensive reference on impact crater science

References

External links 
 Earth Impact Database – List of confirmed earth impact sites at the Planetary and Space Science Centre, University of New Brunswick
 Impact Database (formerly Suspected Earth Impact Sites list) maintained by David Rajmon for Impact Field Studies Group, USA

Antarctica
Lists of coordinates
Prehistory of Antarctica
Antarctica-related lists